Carlos Javier Netto (born 24 July 1970 in Lanús, Argentina) is an Argentine former professional footballer who played as a midfielder for clubs in Argentina, Chile, Mexico, Ecuador and Venezuela. In 1995 he scored in his lone appearance for the Argentina national team.

References

External links
 
 Profile at futbolpasion

1970 births
Living people
Argentine footballers
Association football midfielders
Argentina international footballers
Argentine Primera División players
Argentinos Juniors footballers
San Lorenzo de Almagro footballers
Racing Club de Avellaneda footballers
Cruz Azul footballers
Club Atlético River Plate footballers
Club Atlético Los Andes footballers
C.S. Emelec footballers
A.C.C.D. Mineros de Guayana players
El Porvenir footballers
Sportivo Barracas players
Gimnasia y Esgrima de Concepción del Uruguay footballers
Santiago Morning footballers
Argentine expatriate footballers
Argentine expatriate sportspeople in Chile
Expatriate footballers in Chile
Argentine expatriate sportspeople in Mexico
Expatriate footballers in Mexico
Argentine expatriate sportspeople in Ecuador
Expatriate footballers in Ecuador
Argentine expatriate sportspeople in Venezuela
Expatriate footballers in Venezuela
Sportspeople from Lanús